Tomás Vallejos Cinalli (born 16 October 1984) is an Argentine rugby union player.

A lock forward, Vallejos started his career at Logaritmo Rugby Club in Rosario, before moving to Italy to play professionally for Overmach Parma. Vallejos signed for English side Harlequins during the 2009–10 season to fill the gap left by the injured Jim Evans. He was a replacement for Harlequins in their 2011–12 Premiership final victory over Leicester Tigers. In June 2012 Vallejos joined the Welsh regional team the Scarlets. He was granted a release from his contract with Scarlets to allow him join the Pampas XV and compete fully in the 2013 Vodacom Cup.

International
Vallejos has represented Argentina in the U17, U18, U20 and U23 age groups, and won his first senior cap as a replacement at the 2011 Rugby World Cup against Georgia.

References

1984 births
Living people
Sportspeople from Rosario, Santa Fe
Argentine rugby union players
Argentina international rugby union players
Rugby union locks
Scarlets players
Pampas XV players
Coca-Cola Red Sparks players
Argentine expatriate rugby union players
Expatriate rugby union players in Japan
Expatriate rugby union players in Wales
Argentine expatriate sportspeople in Wales
Argentine expatriate sportspeople in Japan